Juozas Imbrasas (born 8 January 1941 in Algirdai, Ukmergė district municipality) is the former mayor of Vilnius, Lithuania. He is a member of the political party Order and Justice.

Controversy
In 2007 Imbrasas came to international attention for banning a gay rights rally on the basis of 'safety concerns' due to building works. No alternative site for the rally was proposed leading to accusations of discrimination.

References

1941 births
Living people
People from Ukmergė District Municipality
Mayors of Vilnius
Order and Justice politicians
Order and Justice MEPs
MEPs for Lithuania 2009–2014
Members of the Seimas